Łupków Pass or Lupkov Pass is a significant mountain pass in the Carpathian Mountains on the border between Poland and Slovakia, and close to the western border of Ukraine. Its highest point rises 640 m above sea level. It is located just south of the village Łupków in Poland and east of Medzilaborce in Slovakia. Underneath the pass runs a railway tunnel 642 m long, straddling the border between Poland and Slovakia.

The Łupków Pass separates the Low Beskids from the Bieszczady Mountains.

The tunnel and the associated railway line were finished in 1874, to link Galicia with the rest of the Austro-Hungarian Empire across the Carpathian mountains. Given that it was such a vital communications link, the pass had considerable strategic importance.

Łupków Pass was one of the strategically important Carpathian passes bitterly contested in battles on the Eastern Front of World War I during the winter of 1914/1915. An attempt to stand on the line of the Wisłok river and the Łupków Pass failed before renewed Austro-German attacks on 8 May 1915.
The railway tunnel was demolished and rebuilt multiple times during both World Wars. It was rebuilt again in 1946 but saw little use afterwards. Only in 1999 was regular passenger rail service reestablished through the pass.

References

See also
 List of highest paved roads in Europe
 List of mountain passes

Mountain passes of Poland
Mountain passes of Slovakia
Mountain passes of the Carpathians
Landforms of Podkarpackie Voivodeship
Poland–Slovakia border crossings